Sterk Door Combinatie Putten (SDC Putten) is an association football club from Putten, Netherlands. It was founded in 1952.

History
In 1966 SDC Putten promoted from the Tweede Klasse to the Hoofdklasse. Since, it plays predominantly in the Hoofdklasse with some seasons in the Eerste Klasse. In 2022–23, SDC Putten plays in the Eerste Klasse.

SDC Putten reached the Round of 32 of the 2010–11 KNVB Cup.

Notable players 

 Gijsbert Bos
 Evert Brouwers
 Dimitri Djollo
 Sander Duits
 Giovanni Hiwat
 Dick Kooijman

References

External links
 Official site

Football clubs in the Netherlands
Association football clubs established in 1952
1952 establishments in the Netherlands
Football clubs in Gelderland
Putten
SDC Putten